Evolavia (styled as eVOLAvia) was a low-cost airline based in Ancona, Italy. Its name in Italian (e vola via) means and fly away. It has been operating out of Ancona Airport since the middle of 2002 as a low-fare virtual airline, i.e. it sub-contracts other airlines to fly its routes.

Destinations

Evolavia operates low cost flights to Paris, Barcelona, and Palermo.

Evolavia operates from Ancona Airport to: 
France
Paris (Charles de Gaulle Airport)

Fleet
Barcelona services were offered through Spanair on MD-83 and Paris flights through Europe Airpost on Boeing 737-300.

See also
 List of defunct airlines of Italy

References

External links
eVOLAvia.com

Defunct airlines of Italy
Airlines established in 2002
Italian companies established in 2002